Sokhary Chauy is a Cambodian American politician. In 2022, the City Council of Lowell, Massachusetts elected him to become the next mayor, becoming the first American mayor of Cambodian descent to hold the position as well as the first in the whole country.

Early life and education 
Chauy was born in Cambodia. At the end of the Cambodian Civil War his father was shot and killed by the Khmer Rouge. In 1981 he, his mother, and his seven brothers emigrated to the United States, eventually settling in Lowell. As a child, he attended Lowell Public Schools and Phillips Academy, graduating in 1992.

References

External links
 Official Government link
 Official Campaign website

Mayors of Lowell, Massachusetts
Lowell, Massachusetts City Council members
American people of Cambodian descent
Asian-American people in Massachusetts politics
American mayors of Asian descent
Cambodian emigrants to the United States
Politicians from Lowell, Massachusetts
Living people
Year of birth missing (living people)